Eugène Empeyta (12 September 1892 – 20 May 1951) was a Swiss fencer. He competed in foil and épée events at the 1920, 1924 and 1928 Summer Olympics with the best result of fifth place in the team épée in 1920. From 1929 to 1932 he served as president of the Fédération Internationale d'Escrime, and in 1924–1925 and 1939–1943 he headed the Swiss Fencing Federation.

References

External links
 

1892 births
1951 deaths
Swiss male épée fencers
Olympic fencers of Switzerland
Fencers at the 1920 Summer Olympics
Fencers at the 1924 Summer Olympics
Fencers at the 1928 Summer Olympics
Sportspeople from Geneva
Swiss male foil fencers